Chamant is a commune in the Oise department in northern France.

It is situated about 50 km to the north of Paris, and just 2 km to the northeast of Senlis.

Literature
The town figured in the virulently anti-Semitic novel The Jew of Chamant, published in 1898 by George H. D. Gossip under the pseudonym "Ivan Trepoff".

See also
Communes of the Oise department

References

Communes of Oise